The Long Nguyen Secret Zone was a geographical area of the Republic of Vietnam, a heavily-forested area located between Highway 13 and the Michelin Rubber Plantation about  northwest of Saigon, in Binh Duong Province that served as a Viet Cong divisional sanctuary. 

It was the site of numerous military operations during the Vietnam War, including:
 Operation Bushmaster II
 Operation Shenandoah II

References

Base areas of the Viet Cong